The Puente Romano (Spanish for Roman Bridge) is a Roman bridge over the Guadiana River at Mérida in southwest Spain.

It is the world's longest (in terms of distance) surviving bridge from ancient times, having once featured an estimated overall length of 755 m with 62 spans. Today, there are 60 spans (three of which are buried on the southern bank) on a length of 721 m between the abutments. Including the approaches, the structure totals 790 m. It is still in use, but was pedestrianized in 1991 as road traffic was redirected to use the nearby Lusitania Bridge.

Annexed to the bridge is the Alcazaba of Mérida, a Moorish fortification built in 835.

Close to the remains of the Acueducto de los Milagros, there exists another Roman bridge at Mérida, the much smaller Puente de Albarregas.

See also 
 List of Roman bridges
 Roman architecture
 Roman engineering

Notes

Sources

External links 

 
 Traianus – Technical investigation of Roman public works

Roman bridges in Spain
Bridges in Mérida, Spain
Deck arch bridges
Stone bridges in Spain
History of Extremadura
Bridges over the Guadiana River